Newcastelia roseoazurea is a species of plant belonging to the mint family, Lamiaceae, and native to Western Australia.

Description
Newcastelia roseoazurea is a rounded, spreading shrub, growing from 0.3 to 1 m high. Its purple-blue/red-yellow flowerheads may be seen from July to September. It grows on sands and silty flats.

In Western Australia it is found in the IBRA regions of the Great Sandy Desert and the Little Sandy Desert.

It was first described in 1996 by Barbara Rye.

References

External links
 Newcastelia roseoazurea Occurrence data from the Australasian Virtual Herbarium

roseoazurea
Flora of Queensland
Flora of the Northern Territory
Flora of Western Australia
Flora of South Australia
Taxa named by Ferdinand von Mueller
Plants described in 1875